Choronzon is the third studio album by English death metal band Akercocke. It was released on 4 November 2003, through Earache Records.

Background 

The sample at the start of the album is from the opening scene of the Hammer House of Horror episode "Guardian of the Abyss".

Release 

A promotional music video was released for the track "Leviathan", and was shot by Kerrang!'s Paul Harries.

Critical reception 

The album was praised by Kerrang!, who wrote, "Akercocke have had enough time and financial clout to deliver the album they've been threatening to make all along. And its absolutely fucking magnificent [...] countless moments of innovation that will dazzle and delight anyone lusting for a dash of the truly inspirational [...] You will not hear a more imaginative or daring record this year", and calling it the best album of 2003. Terrorizer called it "the most inventive Akercocke album yet".

Track listing

Personnel

Akercocke 

 Jason Mendonca – guitar, vocals, arrangement, production
 Paul Scanlan – guitar, arrangement, production
 The Ritz – keyboards, arrangement, production
 Peter Theobalds – bass guitar, arrangement, production
 David Gray – drums, percussion, arrangement, production

Production 

 Martin Bonsoir – recording, engineering
 Neil Kernon – mixing
 John Paul – mastering

References

External links 

 
 

Akercocke albums
Earache Records albums
2003 albums